Susan Gilmore (born 24 November 1954 in London) is an English actress with a number of television credits to her name, including Elizabeth Fitt in the BBC hospital drama Angels and Avril Rolfe in Howards' Way. She was also a cast member in the thriller serial Maelstrom.

Gilmore was married to rower Daniel Topolski, until his death in February 2015.

References

External links

1954 births
English television actresses
Living people